Cowles Mead (October 18, 1776 – May 17, 1844) was a United States representative from Georgia.  Born in Virginia, he received an English education and became a private practice lawyer.

He presented credentials as a member-elect to the 9th United States Congress (March 4, 1805 – December 24, 1805) but was replaced by Thomas Spalding who contested the initial election outcome. Mead then served as Secretary of the Mississippi Territory, 1806–1807; Acting Governor of Mississippi, 1806–1807; and member of the Mississippi House of Representatives, 1807 and 1822–23.

He was unsuccessful candidate for election to the 13th United States Congress in 1812. He was a delegate to the first constitutional convention of Mississippi in 1817. He was an unsuccessful candidate for election to the 16th United States Congress in 1818. He served in the Mississippi Senate in 1821. He was the Speaker of the Mississippi House of Representatives from 1823 to 1827. He was also an unsuccessful candidate for election as governor of Mississippi in 1825. He died in 1844 on his Greenwood Plantation in Hinds County, Mississippi where he was buried.

References

|-

|-

|-

1776 births
1844 deaths
American slave owners
Delegates to the United States House of Representatives from Mississippi Territory
Democratic-Republican Party members of the United States House of Representatives from Georgia (U.S. state)
Members of the Mississippi House of Representatives
Members of the United States House of Representatives removed by contest
Mississippi Democratic-Republicans
Mississippi state senators
People from Virginia
Speakers of the Mississippi House of Representatives